Wuhan University School of Medicine (also commonly known as Faculty of Medical Sciences) is located in Wuhan, Hubei, China, and is administered by the Ministry of Education of the People's Republic of China. Formerly known as Hubei Medical University (HBMU), the medical school was founded in 1943 and merged with Wuhan University in 2000.

History 

 In 1906, Zhang Zhidong founded in Wuchang the Hubei Army's Military Medical Academy. The school was closed in 1909 and reopened in 1913 as the Hubei Medical School.
 In 1926, the school was incorporated into the National Wuchang Zhongshan University, the forerunner of Wuhan University.
 In 1928, National Wuhan University discontinued medical education for lack of funding.  A new medical school was set up as the Hubei Provincial Medical School. 
 In 1938, the school moved to Enshi due to the Second Sino-Japanese War .
 In 1945, the school moved back to Wuhan and changed its name to the Wuchang Provincial Medical School. 
 In 1957, the school moved to its current site in Wuhan.
 In 1993, the school was renamed as Hubei Medical University.
 In 2000, the school merged with Wuhan University.

Education 
Wuhan University School of Medicine has a full-time faculty of nearly 1,200 people; it has 4,700 full-time students, including more than 2,000 graduate students.
The school's national ranking rose from 19 to 11 after the merger.

Institutions 
Currently, the Faculty/School of Medicine was constituted by eight colleges, three institutes, and three affiliated hospitals.
 Colleges (8): Wuhan University School of Basic Medical School, First Clinical College, Second Clinical College, School of Stomatology, College of Pharmacy, School of Public Health, HOPE School of Nursing, and Vocational and Technical Medical College.
 Research Institutes (3): Institute of Medical Virology, Medical Structural Biology Research Center, and Animal Center.
 Affiliated Hospitals (3): People's Hospital (tertiary level), Zhongnan Hospital (tertiary level), and Stomatological Hospital (tertiary level).

In addition, the Faculty of Medicine is also involved in the formation of the State Key Laboratory of Virology (Wuhan University, Chinese Academy of Sciences, Wuhan Institute of Virology Association), Ministry of Education Key Laboratory of Oral Biomedical Engineering (jointly with Sichuan University).

Famous alumni

Teachers 
 Xia Liangcai, graduated from Sichuan Huaxi University teeth Institute and the United States University of Michigan, a member of the American College of Surgeons, the famous oral medicine educator, Chinese Journal of Oral and Maxillofacial Surgery, one of the founders.
 Gui Xien

Students 
 Li Wenliang, a Chinese doctor who tried to issue the first warning about the COVID-19. Li graduated from Wuhan University School of Medicine as a clinical medicine student in a seven-year combined bachelor's and master's degree program.

See also 
 Wuhan University
 Hubei Medical University
 Tongji Medical College, Huazhong University of Science and Technology

References

External links 
Faculty of  Medicine & Dentistry 
Official web site of Wuhan University School of Medicine (Chinese)
An affiliated hospital of WSM

Medical schools in China
Wuhan University
Wuhan University Faculty of Medical Sciences